Nectar is a loyalty card scheme in the United Kingdom run by Nectar 360 Ltd, a company wholly owned by Sainsbury's. The scheme is the largest in the United Kingdom, and comprises a number of partner companies including Sainsbury's, Esso and eBay. It launched in 2002 with initially four partner companies, and by 2010 had grown to include over 14 companies and over 400 online retailers. Participating companies cover sectors including travel, retail, finance and newspapers.

The scheme was established by Loyalty Management Group, replacing the existing schemes of three of the four launch companies. Nectar was purchased by the Canadian Groupe Aeroplan (now Aimia) in 2007, and purchased by Sainsbury's in 2018.

History
The Nectar scheme was launched in 2002, merging the existing loyalty programmes of Sainsbury's, BP and Barclaycard, and including Debenhams which did not have an existing scheme. It was run by Loyalty Management Group, then chaired by Sir Keith Mills, the founder of Air Miles. Robert Gierkink, who previously played a key role in the founding and launches of Air Miles Canada and Air Miles Netherlands, was founding CEO. The co-founding senior executive team and management shareholders of Nectar – Loyalty Management UK Ltd. further consisted of five Vice Presidents: Todd Almeida (previously Air Miles Netherlands), Martin Briggs, Peter Buis, Steve Lobb (previously  Fly Buys New Zealand ) and Alex Moorhead (previously Air Miles Canada). Additional co-founding management included Koos Berkhout and Jan Pieter Lips, both of whom previously worked for Air Miles Netherlands.

At the time of launch, Nectar confirmed it would be open to more companies to join, excluding rivals of existing members. In December 2007, Loyalty Management Group was purchased by the Canadian Aeroplan, for £368 million. Aeroplan later re-branded itself to Aimia.

By 2010, Nectar claimed that 16.8 million people were part of the scheme, and that it had 14 member companies and over 400 online retailers.

In August 2017, Nectar announced it was partnering with the Daily Mail newspaper. This association upset many customers, who cancelled their accounts and posted photos of their cut-up loyalty cards online. The company responded, "we know that not all of you will support every partner."

On 1 February 2018 J Sainsbury plc announced that it had purchased the Nectar business from Aimia for £60 million.

Sainsbury's began a localised trial with a new Nectar points-earning scheme for stores on the Isle of Wight in April 2018, in which the standard earning rate of one point for each pound spent was replaced by points on specific items plus points based on how frequently and how long a member has been shopping with Sainsbury's.

The trial completed in October 2019, and a redesigned logo and app was launched, with the provision of a digital card on the app to scan.

Collection
Cardholders receive points on purchases made at participating retailers both instore and online, generally beginning at one point per whole pound spent. Points for fuel at Esso and Sainsbury's are awarded for each litre purchased. Extra points may be earned when buying certain products or during particular promotions. A number of other online retailers award points when purchases are made on their websites accessed through the main Nectar website.

Nectar receives a payment from each retailer for each point paid to a customer. It then reimburses the retailer when the points are redeemed.

Redemption
A number of retailers allow cardholders to redeem points in store for money off their shopping, including Argos and Sainsbury's. Points are typically be redeemed in batches of 250, with each point being worth 0.5p.

Points can also be redeemed with a number of partners through avouchers, including Eurostar, eBay, and Caffè Nero. Points are lost if a Nectar account is closed.  For example, an account may be closed if no points have been earned or redeemed for a continuous period of 12 months. As Nectar points do not normally "expire", it is possible for cardholders to save towards more expensive rewards, such as train tickets and holidays.

Participating companies

Current

 American Express (co-branded credit card)
 Argos
 Avanti West Coast
 Bloom & Wild
 British Airways (conversion to and from Avios points)
 DHL Express
 eBay
 Esso (joined 1 June 2019)
 Hull Trains
 London North Eastern Railway
 Sainsbury's (launch member)
 The Daily Mail newspaper
 The Hut Group (runs a "Nectar Exclusives" webstore – includes a variety of products to redeem points)
 TransPennine Express
 Viking Direct

Points can also be collected for purchases from a number of retailers via the Nectar online store, including:
 ASOS.com
 Apple
 Currys
 Dell
 F. Hinds
 Game
 Next
 Sky
 Viagogo
 Virgin Media
 Vodafone (joined 2003, left 2005, rejoined 2009)
 Zavvi

Former
 Amazon (removed on 1 February 2013)
 Barclaycard (was a launch member, however membership ended on 31 August 2005)
 Beefeater (membership ended on 31 January 2011)
 BP (was a launch member, however membership ended on 31 May 2019)
 Brewers Fayre (membership ended on 1 February 2011)
 British Gas (left scheme on 30 June 2015)
 Debenhams (was a launch member, however membership ended on 15 February 2008)
 Dollond & Aitchison
 ebookers (membership ended on 1 June 2009)
 EDF Energy (stopped issuing Nectar points as of 31 December 2010)
 Expedia
 Ford
 Gala Bingo (membership ended on 1 June 2010)
 Great Western Railway (membership ended 30 April 2022)
 HMV
 Homebase (membership ended 31 December 2016)
 Magnet
 South Western Railway (membership ended on 30 April 2021)
 Table Table (left scheme on 31 January 2011)
 TalkTalk (membership ended on 31 August 2009)
 Threshers
 Virgin Trains East Coast
 Virgin Trains West Coast
 Vision Express (removed from 1 January 2015)
 VitalityHealth
 Winemark (Northern Ireland only)

International schemes
Aimia launched Nectar in Italy in 2010, with retailers including Auchan and Unieuro. The Italian scheme ended in February 2016.

A separate scheme is operated by Cencosud in Chile through a licensing agreement with Aimia.

See also
 Tesco Clubcard – Rival supermarket Tesco's loyalty card scheme.

References

External links
 
 Nectar360 Nectar 360 operates the Nectar consumer loyalty programme

BP
Customer loyalty programs
Retailing in the United Kingdom
Sainsbury's
Aimia (company)